CroatianTV-America, Inc. is a wholly owned subsidiary of EURO-World Network Inc.; the Broadcaster's representative for North America and South America; responsible for the overall Marketing and Distribution Strategy of the media offering. The company broadcasts Croatian radio and television programming to the Croatian communities in North America (Canada and the United States).

CroatianTV-America has launched three (3) Croatian television channels and three (3) Croatian radio channels and plans on launching others.

Television Channels
 HRT - Croatian Television (Picture of Croatia)
 NOVA - NOVA World
 RTL - RTL Televizija
 CMC - Croatian Music Channel

Radio Channels
 HRT - Croatian Radio (Voice of Croatia)
 Narodni - Narodni Radio
 MIR - Radio MIR

Availability
The CroatianTV-America programming package is available in North America on the Galaxy-19 (DTH) Direct-to-home satellite platform and/or on the NexTV-America Internet Television platform. CroatianTV-America intends to be available on some of the major cable networks in the US and Canada in 2012.

External links
 NEXTV-America
 NEXTV-Canada

Other links
 STN
 Intelsat
 Irdeto
 Ethnic Channels Group
 Croatian Radio Television
 NOVA TV
 RTL Televizija
 Croatian Music Channel

Television networks in the United States